Aria Noelle Curzon (born December 8, 1987) is an American actress. Her most famous voice roles are Ducky in The Land Before Time video series, Teresa ("The Cornchip Girl") in Recess, and Mandy Straussberg in the radio drama Adventures in Odyssey. She has received 3 Young Artist of Hollywood Awards, (5 nominations) 2 CARE Awards, and one CLIO Award (The CLIO being for a PSA she voiced).

Life and career
At age six, Curzon realized her interest in acting and performing while watching one of her favorite Shirley Temple videos. With her mother's help and care, she began auditioning, and began her acting career in a Crayola commercial. In addition to acting, she is also a musician, singing and learning both guitar and fiddle, and is a prize-winning Irish dancer.

She has guest starred on many television shows, including  Gigantic, Without A Trace, JAG, The Pretender, and Sabrina, the Teenage Witch. Her credits include Treehouse Hostage (with Jim Varney) and Santa With Muscles, starring Hulk Hogan, Adam Wylie, and Mila Kunis, and the 2011 film The Muppets.

Curzon has done voiceover work in such animated films as The Land Before Time film series. She is a regular in the animated series The Land Before Time which premiered in March 2007. Other voiceover work includes radio and TV commercials.

Filmography

External links
Official website (archived)

1987 births
American people of Portuguese descent
American child actresses
American child singers
American film actresses
American voice actresses
American stage actresses
American television actresses
Living people
Place of birth missing (living people)
21st-century American singers
21st-century American women singers